Lokanarkavu Temple is an ancient Hindu temple situated  in Memunda  4 km from Vatakara, in Kozhikode District, North Malabar region of Kerala state of south India. Lokanarkavu is a short form of Lokamalayarkavu which means lokam (world) made of mala (mountain), aaru (river) and kavu (grove). The closest railway station is at Vatakara, which is 5 km from temple. The nearest airport is Kannur airport which is 54 km away.

Pooram is the important festival here and it is conducted with great pomp and show. The week-long festival begins with Kodiyettam (flag hoisting) and concludes with Arattu. The temple dedicated to goddess Durga has great historical importance as Thacholi Othenan, the legendary martial hero of Kerala, used to worship here every day.

Lokanarkavu and Kalarippayattu
Thirty days Mandala Utsavam in Malayalam month Vrischikam (November–December) and pooram in Malayalam month meenam (March–April)  are  the annual festival at the Lokanarkavu Bhagavathy Temple. This is the only temple where a peculiar folk dance called Poorakkali is presented during festivals. The dance, resembles the martial art Kalarippayattu. Even today, all Kalaripayattu artists seek the blessings of the deity before their debut due to the association of Lokanarkavu Temple with legendary hero thacholi othenan.

Gallery

See also
 Kalarippayattu
 Thacholi Othenan
 Memunda
 Temples of Kerala

External links 

Hindu temples in Kozhikode district
Bhagavathi temples in Kerala